Wyke is a ward in the metropolitan borough of the City of Bradford, West Yorkshire, England.  It contains 63 listed buildings that are recorded in the National Heritage List for England.  Of these, two are listed at Grade II*, the middle of the three grades, and the others are at Grade II, the lowest grade.  The ward contains the village of Wyke and parts of Low Moor and Oakenshaw.  It is mainly residential, with some industry, and parts of it are rural.  Most of the listed buildings are houses, cottages, and associated structures, farmhouses and farm buildings.  The other listed buildings include churches, public houses, buildings associated with a Moravian settlement, a former school, two milestones, a former railway station and warehouse, a chimney and boiler house, and a war memorial.


Key

Buildings

References

Citations

Sources

 

Lists of listed buildings in West Yorkshire